Lord and Lady Algy may refer to:

 Lord and Lady Algy (play), an 1898 play by the British writer R.C. Carton
 Lord and Lady Algy (film), a 1919 American silent film adaptation